The 1969 Oregon Webfoots football team represented the University of Oregon during the 1969 NCAA University Division football season. Home games were played on campus in Eugene at Autzen Stadium. Opened two years earlier in 1967 with natural grass, the field was switched to AstroTurf and lights were added prior to this season.

After four road games in the first five, Oregon began a five-game home stand in late October with wins over Washington and Idaho and climbed to 

After a tie with Army, the Ducks met UCLA for the first time since 1958, the final season of the Pacific Coast Conference (PCC); it was the Bruins' first visit to Eugene since 1953. Seventh-ranked, UCLA's high-scoring offense had not fared well on artificial turf, and needed a late interception by the Bruin defense to remain undefeated and escape with a  win. The following week, Oregon State won their sixth consecutive Civil War game, the first on fake grass.

The season finale, a 57–16 win at overmatched Hawaii, put the Ducks back to .500 for eleven games. (Hawaii was in the college division (later Division II) until 1974.)

Sophomore wingback Bobby Moore (Ahmad Rashad) was named to the all-conference team. Quarterback Dan Fouts played on the frosh team; freshmen in the university division were ineligible for the varsity until the 1972 season.

Schedule

References

External links
 Game program: Oregon at Washington State – October 4, 1969
 Game video (color) – Oregon at Washington State – October 4, 1969

Oregon
Oregon Ducks football seasons
Oregon Webfoots football